TRG may refer to:

 Sako TRG, a bolt-action sniper rifle
 an acronym for the firearm technique Tap, Rack and Go
 Tactical Response Group, police tactical group in New South Wales, Australia
 Western Australia Police Tactical Response Group
 Tauranga Airport, New Zealand, IATA airport code
 The Racer's Group, an automobile racing team commonly known as TRG Motorsports 
 The Regular Guys, a syndicated morning radio show
 Tory Reform Group, in the UK Conservative Party
 Traralgon railway station, Victoria, Australia, station code
 Tiny Rascal Gang, Asian street gang predominantly in the US
 TRG (gene)
 Trg in some Slavic languages means approximately "town square", and is found in many place names, for example
Stari Trg (disambiguation)
Trg Nikole Pašića
 

he:עץ#טבעות העץ